Diane Winston is an American professor of Media and Religion at the Annenberg School for Communication and Journalism at the University of Southern California, and an author.  USC lists her current research interests as media coverage of Islam, religion and new media, and the place of religion in American identity.

She received her B.A. from Brandeis, a Masters in Theological Studies from Harvard Divinity School, a masters in journalism from Columbia, and her Ph.D. in religion from Princeton University.

She has previously worked as a journalist at The Baltimore Sun, Dallas Times Herald, and The News and Observer in Raleigh, North Carolina.

She has written about the Salvation Army,  and has been interviewed by the news media about the interrelationships of religion and modern culture.

Bibliography

Boozers, brass bands, and hallejlujah lassies: the Salvation Army and American commercial culture, 1880-1918, Princeton University, 1996
Red Hot and Righteous: The Urban Religion of the Salvation Army, Harvard University Press, 2000, 
Co-editor, Faith in the Market: Religion and the Rise of Urban Commercial Culture, Rutgers University Press, 2002 
Editor and Author, Small Screen, Big Picture: Television and Lived Religion, Baylor University Press, 2009

References

Living people
University of Southern California faculty
Harvard Divinity School alumni
Brandeis University alumni
Columbia University Graduate School of Journalism alumni
Princeton University alumni
1951 births